is a 2004 Japanese film directed by Tetsuo Shinohara about a struggling classical pianist who is sent to heaven to work in a bookstore.  It is based on two novels, written by Atsushi Matsuhisa and Wataru Tanaka.

Plot
Kenta (Tetsuji Tamayama), a classically trained pianist, is fired from his orchestra and gets drunk in a bar.  He wakes up the following morning in what turns out to be a bookstore in heaven.  The owner of the bookstore had brought him there, and explains that people live to be 100; people who die before this age go to heaven to live out the rest of their allotted time before they are reborn on earth.

In heaven, he meets Shoko (Yūko Takeuchi), a pianist who he had admired on earth.  Together, they start work on a special composition that she had started writing on earth.

Meanwhile, on earth, Shoko's niece Natsuko (also played by Yūko Takeuchi) wants to organise a fireworks display that was discontinued twelve years ago.  It turns out that Shoko had been engaged to Takimoto (Teruyuki Kagawa), a talented firework maker, but her hearing had been damaged by a firework accident he caused.  As a result, she stopped playing music, he stopped making fireworks, they split up, and later she died.

Natsuko wants Takimoto to make his special 'loving fireworks' for the fireworks display. These are the special fireworks that inspired Shoko to compose her special composition, uncompleted when Takimoto stopped making them.  He is vehemently opposed to making fireworks again.

However, at the end of the firework display 'loving fireworks' unexpectedly appear in the sky, set-off by Takimoto. Kenta returns to earth and plays Shoko's now completed composition to accompany them. Natsuko and Kenta meet.  She asks how he knows the piece, to which he responds that he met 'her'. In the end, they start laughing together (as the credits begin to roll).

External links
 Official Site
 

2004 films
2000s Japanese-language films
Films directed by Tetsuo Shinohara
2000s Japanese films